The Housing Act 1935 is an Act of Parliament in the United Kingdom. It required every local authority to submit a programme of building and demolition aimed at eliminating slums from their area.

References

United Kingdom Acts of Parliament 1935
Housing legislation in the United Kingdom